Choi Seung Hyun, also known as Shawn Choi, is a South Korean film score composer. He has composed music for movies such as Oldboy, The Classic, Windstruck, My Girlfriend Is an Agent, and many more. His works are well known to movie fans around the world. He has also composed music for video games and television. Choi is the founder of PSALM Music Production and is focusing on contemporary Christian music.

Filmography

Film score
Ardor (2002)
The Classic (2003)
If You Were Me (2003)
Ice Rain (2004)
Windstruck (2004)
Sympathy for Lady Vengeance (2005)
Coma (2006)
Fly High (2006)
Small Town Rivals (2007)
Black House (2007)
Wide Awake (2007)
The Guard Post (2008)
My Mighty Princess (2008)
Dachimawa Lee (2008)
My Girlfriend Is an Agent (2009)
Sisters on the Road (2009)
Yoga Hakwon (2009)
City of Fathers (2009)
Lady Daddy (2010)
Joomoonjin (2010)
	Short! Short! Short! : Fantastic Theater (2010) 
Children... (2011)
Runway Cop (2012)
Meet Miss Anxiety (2014)
The Long Way Home (2015)
Bounty Hunters (2016)
Time To Play (2019)
What Happened to Mr. Cha? (2021)
Whisper In The Wind (2021)

Music department
Waikiki Brothers (2001) 
Friend (2001 film) 
Dig or Die (2002)
Silmido (2003)
Oldboy (2003)
No

External links
http://www.schoimusic.com

South Korean film score composers
Music directors
Living people
Year of birth missing (living people)